Miss Universe 1954, the 3rd edition of Miss Universe pageant, was held on 24 July 1954 at the Long Beach Municipal Auditorium in Long Beach, California, United States. There were 33 competitors. Miss USA, 21-year-old Miriam Stevenson won the competition. She was the first American Miss Universe and the first winner to be crowned by the outgoing Miss Universe (who was Miss Universe 1953, Christiane Martel of France).

Stevenson is the first Miss Universe to concurrently hold the Miss USA and Miss Universe titles (future American Miss Universe winners had to step down as Miss USA upon winning Miss Universe beginning in 1965 when Miss USA would be separated to independent production from Miss Universe).

Results

Placements

Contestants

  Alaska - Charlein Lander
  - Ivana Olga Kislinger
  - Shirley Bliss
  - Christiane Darnay Neckaerts
  - Maria Martha Hacker Rocha †
  Canada - Joyce Mary Landry
  - Gloria Leguisos Mesina
  - Marian Esquivel McKeown
  - Isis Finlay †
  - Myrna Ros Orozco
  - Lenita Airisto
  - Jacqueline Beer
  - Regina Ernst
  - Rika Dialina
  - Lilliam Padilla
  - Virginia June Lee 
  - Aviva Pe’er
  - Maria Teresa Paliani
  - Mieko Kondo
  - Kae Sun-hee
  - Elvira Castillo Olivera †
  - Moana Manley †
  - Mona Stornes
  - Liliana Torre
  - Isabella León Velarde Dancuart
  - Blesilda Mueler Ocampo †
  - Lucy Santiago
  Singapore - Marjorie Wee
  - Ragnhild Olausson
  - Amara Asavananda
  - Miriam Stevenson
  - Ana Moreno
  - Evelyn Laura Andrade

Notes

Debuts

 
 
 
 
 
 
 
  Singapore

Returns
Last competed in 1952:

Withdrawals

 
 
  - Kapiolani Miller
 
 
 
  - Berta Elena Landaeta Urdaneta

Did not compete
  - Camila Rego

Replacement
  - Efi Androulakakis was replaced by Rika Dialina.

Awards
  - Miss Friendship (Efi Androulakakis)
  - Most Popular Girl (Martha Rocha)

See also
 Miss USA 1954

General references

References

External links
 Miss Universe official website

1954
1954 in California
1954 beauty pageants
Beauty pageants in the United States
July 1954 events in the United States